The Swan Hotel is a grade II* listed hotel in Church Street, Bradford-on-Avon, Wiltshire, England. It is of uncertain age but probably dates from the seventeenth century.

References

External links

Grade II* listed buildings in Wiltshire
Grade II* listed hotels
Buildings and structures completed in the 17th century
Hotels in Wiltshire
Bradford-on-Avon